Muḥammad ibn Isḥāq ibn Yasār ibn Khiyār (according to some sources, ibn Khabbār, or Kūmān, or Kūtān, or simply ibn Isḥaq, meaning "the son of Isaac"; died 767) was an 8th-century Muslim historian and hagiographer. Ibn Ishaq collected oral traditions that formed the basis of an important biography of the Islamic prophet Muhammad.

Life
Born in Medina circa A.H. 85 (A.D. 704), ibn Isḥaq's grandfather was Yasār, one of forty Christian or Jewish boys who had been held captive in a monastery at Ayn al-Tamr. After being found in one of Khalid ibn al-Walid's campaigns, Yasār was taken to Medina and enslaved to Qays ibn Makhrama ibn al-Muṭṭalib ibn ʿAbd Manāf ibn Quṣayy. On his conversion to Islam, he was manumitted as "mawlā" (client), thus acquiring the surname, or "nisbat", al-Muṭṭalibī. His three sons, Mūsā, ʿAbd al-Raḥmān, and Isḥāq, were transmitters of "akhbār", ie they collected and recounted written and oral testaments of the past. Isḥāq married the daughter of another mawlā and from this marriage Ibn Isḥāq was born.

No facts of Ibn Isḥāq's early life are known, but it is likely that he followed in the family tradition of transmission of early akhbār and hadith. He was influenced by the work of ibn Shihab al-Zuhri, who praised the young ibn Ishaq for his knowledge of "maghāzī" (stories of military expeditions). Around the age of 30, ibn Isḥaq arrived in Alexandria and studied under Yazīd ibn Abī Ḥabīb. After his return to Medina, based on one account, he was ordered out of Medina for attributing a hadith to a woman he had not met, Fāṭima bint al-Mundhir, the wife of Hishām ibn ʿUrwa. But those who defended him, like Sufyan ibn ʽUyaynah, stated that Ibn Ishaq told them that he did meet her. Also ibn Ishaq disputed with the young Malik ibn Anas, famous for the Maliki School of Fiqh. Leaving Medina (or forced to leave), he traveled eastwards towards "al-Irāq", stopping in Kufa, also al-Jazīra, and into Iran as far as Ray, before returning west. Eventually he settled in Baghdad. There, the new Abbasid dynasty, having overthrown the Umayyad dynasty, was establishing a new capital.

Ibn Isḥaq moved to the capital and found patrons in the new regime. He became a tutor employed by the Abbasid caliph Al-Mansur, who commissioned him to write an all-encompassing history book starting from the creation of Adam to the present day, known as "al-Mubtadaʾ wa al-Baʿth wa al-Maghāzī" (lit. "In the Beginning, the mission [of Muhammad], and the expeditions"). It was kept in the court library of Baghdad. Part of this work contains the Sîrah or biography of the Prophet, the rest was once considered a lost work, but substantial fragments of it survive. He died in Baghdad in A.H. 150.

Biography of Muhammad (Sīrat Rasūl Allāh)

Original versions, survival
Ibn Isḥaq collected oral traditions about the life of the Islamic prophet Muhammad. These traditions, which he orally dictated to his pupils, are now known collectively as Sīratu Rasūli l-Lāh ( "Life of the Messenger of God") and survive mainly in the following sources:

 An edited copy, or recension, of his work by his student al-Bakka'i, which was further edited by ibn Hisham. Al-Bakka'i's work has perished and only ibn Hisham's has survived, in copies. Ibn Hisham edited out of his work "things which it is disgraceful to discuss; matters which would distress certain people; and such reports as al-Bakka'i told me he could not accept as trustworthy."
 An edited copy, or recension, prepared by his student Salamah ibn Fadl al-Ansari. This also has perished, and survives only in the copious extracts to be found in the voluminous History of the Prophets and Kings by Muhammad ibn Jarir al-Tabari.
 Fragments of several other recensions. Guillaume lists them on p. xxx of his preface, but regards most of them as so fragmentary as to be of little worth.

According to Donner, the material in ibn Hisham and al-Tabari is "virtually the same". However, there is some material to be found in al-Tabari that was not preserved by ibn Hisham. For example, al-Tabari includes the controversial episode of the Satanic Verses, while ibn Hisham does not.

Following the publication of previously unknown fragments of ibn Isḥaq's traditions, recent scholarship suggests that ibn Isḥaq did not commit to writing any of the traditions now extant, but they were narrated orally to his transmitters. These new texts, found in accounts by Salama al-Ḥarranī and Yūnus ibn Bukayr, were hitherto unknown and contain versions different from those found in other works.

Reconstruction of the text

The original text of the Sīrat Rasūl Allāh by Ibn Ishaq did not survive. Yet it was one of the earliest substantial biographies of Muhammad. However, much of the original text was copied over into a work of his own by Ibn Hisham (Basra; Fustat, died 833 AD, 218 AH).

Ibn Hisham also "abbreviated, annotated, and sometimes altered" the text of Ibn Ishaq, according to Guillaume (at p. xvii). Interpolations made by Ibn Hisham are said to be recognizable and can be deleted, leaving as a remainder, a so-called "edited" version of Ibn Ishaq's original text (otherwise lost). In addition, Guillaume (at p. xxxi) points out that Ibn Hisham's version omits various narratives in the text which were given by al-Tabari in his History. In these passages al-Tabari expressly cites Ibn Ishaq as a source.

Thus can be reconstructed an 'improved' "edited" text, i.e., by distinguishing or removing Ibn Hisham's additions, and by adding from al-Tabari passages attributed to Ibn Ishaq. Yet the result's degree of approximation to Ibn Ishaq's original text can only be conjectured. Such a reconstruction is available, e.g., in Guillaume's translation. Here, Ibn Ishaq's introductory chapters describe pre-Islamic Arabia, before he then commences with the narratives surrounding the life of Muhammad (in Guillaume at pp. 109–690).

Reception 

Notable scholars like the jurist Ahmad ibn Hanbal appreciated his efforts in collecting sīra narratives and accepted him on maghāzī, despite having reservations on his methods on matters of fiqh. Ibn Ishaq also influenced later sīra writers like Ibn Hishām and Ibn Sayyid al-Nās. Other scholars, like Ibn Qayyim Al-Jawziyya, made use of his chronological ordering of events.   

The most widely discussed criticism of his sīra was that of his contemporary Mālik ibn Anas. Mālik rejected the stories of Muhammad and the Jews of Medina on the ground that they were taken solely based on accounts by sons of Jewish converts. These same stories have also been denounced as "odd tales" (gharāʾib) later by ibn Hajar al-Asqalani. Mālik and others also thought that ibn Isḥāq exhibited Qadari tendencies, had a preference for Ali (Guillaume also found evidence of this, pp. xxii &xxiv), and relied too heavily on what were later called the Isrā'īlīyāt. Furthermore, early literary critics, like ibn Sallām al-Jumaḥī and ibn al-Nadīm, censured ibn Isḥāq for knowingly including forged poems in his biography, and for attributing poems to persons not known to have written any poetry. The 14th-century historian al-Dhahabī, using hadith terminology, noted that in addition to the forged (makdhūb) poetry, Ibn Isḥāq filled his sīra with many munqaṭiʿ (broken chain of narration) and munkar (suspect narrator) reports.

Guillaume notices that Ibn Isḥāq frequently uses a number of expressions to convey his skepticism or caution. Beside a frequent note that only God knows whether a particular statement is true or not (p. xix), Guillaume suggests that Ibn Isḥāq deliberately substitutes the ordinary term "ḥaddathanī" (he narrated to me) by a word of suspicion "zaʿama" ("he alleged") to show his skepticism about certain traditions (p. xx).

Michael Cook laments that comparing Ibn Ishaq with the later commentator Al-Waqid — who based his writing on Ibn Ishaq but added much colorful but made-up detail — reveals how oral history can be contaminated by the fiction of storytellers (qussa).  "We have seen what half a century of story-telling could achieve between Ibn Ishaq and al-Waqidi, at a time when we know that much material had already been committed to writing. What the same processes may have brought about in the century before Ibn Ishaq is something we can only guess at."

Cook's fellow revisionist Patricia Crone complains that Sīrat is full of "contradictions, confusions, inconsistencies and anomalies," written "not by a grandchild, but a great grandchild of the Prophet's generation", that it is written from the point of view of the ulama and Abbasid, so that "we shall never know ... how the Umayyad caliphs remembered their prophet".

Popular historian Tom Holland believes that Ibn Ishaq should be compared to Homer, and his writing regarded as literature rather than history. Just as Homer believed the gods determined fates in the Iliad and Odyssey, so  Ibn Ishaq described hosts of angels coming to the aid of Muhammad at the Battle of Badr.

Translations

In 1864 the Heidelberg professor Gustav Weil published an annotated German translation in two volumes. Several decades later the Hungarian scholar Edward Rehatsek prepared an English translation, but it was not published until over a half-century later.

The best-known translation in a Western language is Alfred Guillaume's 1955 English translation, but some have questioned the reliability of this translation. In it Guillaume combined ibn Hisham and those materials in al-Tabari cited as ibn Isḥaq's whenever they differed or added to ibn Hisham, believing that in so doing he was restoring a lost work. The extracts from al-Tabari are clearly marked, although sometimes it is difficult to distinguish them from the main text (only a capital "T" is used).

Other works
Ibn Isḥaq wrote several works. His major work is al-Mubtadaʾ wa al-Baʿth wa al-Maghāzī—the Kitab al-Mubtada and Kitab al-Mab'ath both survive in part, particularly al-Mab'ath, and al-Mubtada otherwise in substantial fragments. He is also credited with the lost works Kitāb al-kh̲ulafāʾ, which al-Umawwī related to him (Fihrist, 92; Udabāʾ, VI, 401) and a book of Sunan (Ḥād̲j̲d̲j̲ī Ḵh̲alīfa, II, 1008).

Reliability of his hadith

In hadith studies, ibn Isḥaq's hadith (considered separately from his prophetic biography) is generally thought to be "good" (ḥasan) (assuming an accurate and trustworthy isnad, or chain of transmission) and himself having a reputation of being "sincere" or "trustworthy" (ṣadūq). However, a general analysis of his isnads has given him the negative distinction of being a mudallis, meaning one who did not name his teacher, claiming instead to narrate directly from his teacher's teacher. According to Ibn Hajar al-Asqalani, Ibn Ishaq was notorious for committing Tadlis which is failing to disclose the names of those who he had heard the narration from due to him hearing the report from unreliable and unknown persons, he would also commit Tadlis, from individuals who were seen as unreliable for more severe reasons. Because of his tadlīs, many scholars including Muhammad al-Bukhari hardly ever used his narrations in their sahih books. Ibn Hibban states about Ibn Ishaq: “The problem with Ibn Ishaq is that he used to omit the names of unreliable narrators, as a result of which unreliable material crept into his narrations. However, if he makes it clear that he has actually heard from the person whom he states as his source, then his narration is authentic". According to al-Khaṭīb al-Baghdādī, all scholars of ahadith except one no longer rely on any of his narrations, although truth is not foreign to him. Others, like Ahmad ibn Hanbal, rejected his narrations on all matters related to fiqh. Al-Dhahabī concluded that the soundness of his narrations regarding ahadith is hasan, except in hadith where he is the sole transmitter which should probably be considered as munkar. He added that some Imams mentioned him, including Muslim ibn al-Hajjaj, who cited five of Ibn Ishaq's ahadith in his Sahih. The muhaddith Ibn 'Adi stated that he didn't find anything which showed any of his hadiths were da'if. He further adds that nothing could stand up to his sirah and maghazi works.

See also
List of biographies of Muhammad
List of Muslim historians

References

Books and journals

 Michael V McDonald and William Montgomery Watt (trans.) The history of al-Tabari Volume 6: Muhammad at Mecca (Albany, New York, 1987) 
 Michael V McDonald (trans.), William Montgomery Watt (annot.) The history of al-Tabari Volume 7: The foundation of the community: Muhammad at al-Madina (Albany, New York, 1987) 
 Michael Fishbein (trans.) The history of al-Tabari Volume 8: The victory of Islam (Albany, New York, 1997) 
 Ismail K Poonawalla (trans.) The history of al-Tabari Volume 9: The last years of the Prophet (Albany, New York, 1985)

Bibliography

Primary sources
Alfred Guillaume, The Life of Muhammad. A Translation of Isḥaq's "Sirat Rasul Allah", with introduction [pp. xiii–xliii] and notes (Oxford University, 1955), xlvii + 815 pages. The Arabic text used by Guillaume was the Cairo edition of 1355/1937 by Mustafa al-Saqqa, Ibrahim al-Abyari and Abdul-Hafiz Shalabi, as well as another, that of F. Wustenfeld (Göttingen, 1858–1860). Ibn Hasham's "notes" are given at pages 691–798. digital scan
 
Gustav Weil, Das Leben Mohammed's nach Mohammed Ibn Ishak, bearbeitet von Abd el-Malik Ibn Hischam (Stuttgart: J.B. Metzler'schen Buchhandlung, 1864), 2 volumes. The Sirah Rasul Allah translated into German with annotations. digital edition
Ibn Isḥaq, The Life of Muhammad. Apostle of Allah (London: The Folio Society, 1964), 177 pages. From a translation by Edward Rehatsek (Hungary 1819 – Mumbai [Bombay] 1891), abridged and introduced [at pp. 5–13] by Michael Edwards. Rehatsek completed his translation; in 1898 it was given to the Royal Asiatic Society of London by F.F. Arbuthnot.

Traditional biographies
 Ibn Sayyid al-Nās, ʿUyūn al-athar fī funūn al-maghāzī wa al-shamāʾil wa al-siyar.
 Al-Khaṭīb al-Baghdādī, Tārīkh Baghdād.
 Al-Dhahabī, Mīzān al-iʿtidāl fī naqd al-rijāl.
 Yāqūt al-Ḥamawī, Irshād al-arīb fī mʿrefat al-adīb.

Secondary sources
 
 Robinson, Chase, Islamic Historiography, Cambridge University Press, 2003,

External links

 Biodata at MuslimScholars.info

767 deaths
8th-century historians from the Abbasid Caliphate
Hadith scholars
Writers of lost works
704 births
Arab biographers
8th-century Arabs
8th-century Arabic writers
People from Medina
8th-century people from the Umayyad Caliphate